Komm, süßer Tod ("Come, Sweet Death") is a 1998 novel by Austrian author Wolf Haas. It is named after a musical piece by Johann Sebastian Bach. It was picturised in 2000 as Komm, süßer Tod.

Plot summary

Disillusioned paramedic and ex-cop Simon Brenner finds himself trapped between the front lines of two competing Emergency Medical Services in Vienna's relentless summer heat. Things turn really hot when Brenner starts looking into the unusually high death rate of elderly patients.

Characters
Simon Brenner – ex police officer, main protagonist

External links

1998 novels
Black comedy books
Novels set in Vienna
Austrian novels adapted into films
20th-century Austrian novels
Novels by Leopold von Sacher-Masoch